Wijekoon Mudiyanselage Piyadasa (22 October 1940 – 9 February 2003 as පියදාස විජේකෝන්) was a Sri Lankan stunt and character actor. His career spanned over 42 years with 140 films and he played a wide variety of roles in that time. Perhaps one of his most notable was as a Police Inspector in Siripala Saha Ranmenike (1977). This was an unusual role as most of his roles were negative up to that time.

Personal life
Wijekoon attended Narahenpita Vidyawardena School. His son Priyantha Wijekoon is also an actor.

Acting career
He made his film debut uncredited in a song sequence of the film Sirakaruwa in 1957. He got his first major role in A. S. Nagarajan's Purusha Ratnaya (1959) playing the brother of the heroine. It was Nagarajan who suggested he stylize his name as 'Piyadasa Wijekoon'.

After Nagarajan, Robin Tampoe took Wijekoon under his wing and began giving him roles in his films. Under Tampoe's guidance Wijekoon shaved his hair and played a villain for the first time in Suhada Divi Piduma (1961). This role proved popular and Wijekoon was flooded with villain roles from then on. Some of his popular stage dramas include Siwamma Dhanapala, Apuru Yahaluwo and Manape.

Through the 1960s and 1970s, Wijekoon's performances in films revolved around playing henchman and thug type characters who got into and lost fights with the hero. A notable exception was Siripala Saha Ranmenike where he played a positive character though still at odds with the anti-hero Ravindra Randeniya.

In the 1980s and 1990s as he grew fatty and older Wijekoon began to take comedic roles and stopped doing fighting roles.

Filmography

References

External links 
Sri Lanka Sinhala Films Database – Piyadasa Wijekoon

1948 births
2003 deaths
Sri Lankan male film actors
Sinhalese male actors